Garland A. Rivers (born November 3, 1964) is a former professional American football defensive back who was drafted in the 1987 NFL Draft by the Detroit Lions of the National Football League (NFL).  He played briefly for the Chicago Bears in the 1987 NFL season after having starred as an All-American for the Michigan Wolverines football team for whom he set the single-game tackles record as a sophomore.  This record still stands.  After returning to the University of Michigan to complete his bachelor's degree, he returned to professional football for several seasons in the Arena Football League.  However, before returning to professional football he became embroiled in a scandal involving sports agents engaging amateur athletes.

College career

After attending Canton McKinley High School, where they won the 1981 Ohio High School Athletic Association football championships, he went to the University of Michigan where he became the only freshman varsity letter winner on the football team in 1983.  Rivers, who wore #13 as a Wolverine, started 32 consecutive games until a shoulder injury caused him to end the streak.  He posted six interceptions in his Michigan career, including one for a touchdown.  Another one during the same season was a game saving interception in the 1986 Fiesta Bowl in a 27–23 victory over the Nebraska Cornhuskers football team.  Rivers started 12 of the 13 games his senior season for the Big Ten Conference champions and was one of three All-Americans  (along with Jumbo Elliott & Jim Harbaugh) that season as the team went 11–2 and was invited to the Rose Bowl.  Rivers once had 17 tackles and an assist as a sophomore defensive back in a game against the 1984 National Champion Brigham Young Cougars football team in the 1984 Holiday Bowl. 17 tackles continues to stand alone as a school single game record.

His college athletic career was not without controversy.  He was named by Michigan Football coach and Michigan Wolverines athletic director Bo Schembechler as one of two players (the other being Robert Perryman) who had transgressed National Collegiate Athletic Association rules in violation of their amateur status.  According to Schembechler, both players had signed contracts and accepted loans from agents before their college eligibility expired.  Schembechler testified in a Federal District Court case involving charges of mail fraud and racketeering against Norby Walters and Lloyd Bloom.  According to Schembechler, Rivers had denied having entered into an agreement before the team's 1986 NCAA Division I-A football season had ended in a meeting with him, but confessed in a Federal Bureau of Investigation meeting.  Because the investigation occurred late in the Spring academic term at Michigan, River's athletic scholarship in the form tuition and room and board had already been fully paid by the University.  However, when Rivers returned to Michigan in 1988 to complete his degree, the university did not provide a scholarship for which he would have otherwise been eligible.

Professional career
Rivers was drafted by the Detroit Lions of the National Football League with the eighth pick of the fourth round (92nd overall) of the 1987 NFL Draft.  He played briefly for the Chicago Bears under Mike Ditka in 1987.  The Bears went 11–4 that season and qualified for the 1987-88 NFL playoffs that season.

Garland Rivers played for several years in the Arena Football League as a wide receiver and linebacker.  He mostly played on defense.  He played for the Albany Firebirds for 1990 and 1991.  The Firebirds qualified for the 4-team 1991 AFL playoffs as the #4 seed and lost to the #1 seed Detroit Drive in the first round.  Then, he played for the Arizona Rattlers in 1992 and 1993.  The Rattlers qualified for 8-team the 1993 AFL playoffs as the #4 seed and advanced to the second round before losing to the #1 seed Detroit Drive.

Rivers has coached at Timken, McKinley and GlenOak. , he worked for Indian River School.

Family
Rivers was inducted into the Stark High School Hall of Fame in 2012. His son Jewone Snow, by Linda Snow, is a form McKinley Bulldogs (class of 2010) football standout. Snow is the sister of Percy Snow and Eric Snow, who were also standout athletes for McKinley. Jewone went to college at West Virginia where he joined the football team. Rivers is the father of three sons and two daughters.

Notes

External links
Top Michigan Football Players 1969-2000
Top 100 Michigan Football players
AFL stats

1964 births
Living people
African-American players of American football
Albany Firebirds players
All-American college football players
American football defensive backs
Arizona Rattlers players
Chicago Bears players
Michigan Wolverines football players
Players of American football from Canton, Ohio
National Football League replacement players
21st-century African-American people
20th-century African-American sportspeople